Roundtrip is a 2004 Italian comedy film written and directed by Marco Ponti and starring  Libero De Rienzo and Vanessa Incontrada.

Cast 

Libero De Rienzo as Dante Cruciani
Vanessa Incontrada as Nina
Kabir Bedi as  Tolstoj
Remo Girone as  Dante's Father
Ugo Conti as Man in White 
Michele Di Mauro as  Skorpio 
 Fabio Troiano as  Smeg
 Giuseppe Loconsole as  Stampella	 
 Germana Pasquero as  Number One

See also 
 List of Italian films of 2004

References

External links

Italian comedy films
2004 comedy films
2004 films
Films set in Turin
Films directed by Marco Ponti
2000s Italian-language films